Cypriola is a genus of beetles in the family Cerambycidae. It is monotypic, being represented by the single species  Cypriola acanthocinoides. It was described by Thomson in 1865.

References

Lamiini
Beetles described in 1865